Space Metal may refer to:
Space metal, a subgenre of space rock
Space Metal (UFO album), a 1976 album by the band UFO
Space Metal (Star One album), a 2002 album by the band Star One